Yolonda Lorig Colson is an American thoracic surgeon, working in Boston, who is the first female president of the American Association for Thoracic Surgery (AATS). She assumed her current role as the 103rd president of the AATS on May 26, 2022, succeeding Shaf Keshavjee, MD. Colson is the Chief of the Division of Thoracic Surgery at Massachusetts General Hospital, Hermes C. Grillo Professor in Thoracic Surgery, and Professor of Surgery at Harvard Medical School. Colson is an Officer and Exam Chair for the American Board of Thoracic Surgery. She is also a collaborator of the Grinstaff Group.

Education 
Colson completed her Bachelor of Science (B.S.) in Biomedical Engineering from Rensselaer Polytechnic Institute, Doctor of Medicine (M.D.) from Mayo Medical School, and Doctor of Philosophy (Ph.D.) and general surgery residency at the University of Pittsburgh School of Medicine. She then completed a fellowship in cardiothoracic surgery at Brigham and Women's Hospital.

Grants 

Colson has been awarded many R29 and R01  NIH and NCI grants:

 Biodegradable, Biocompatible Pressure Sensitive Adhesives (2022)
 Supratherapeutic PTX Buttresses Reduce Locoregional Recurrence Rates Following Surgery for Soft Tissue Sarcomas (2022)
 Optimization Of Nanoparticle Tumor-Localization And Drug-Loadingfor Treating Mesothelioma (2022, 2021, 2020)
 Tumor Specific Delivery Of Verticillin A Overcomes Epigenetic Silencing Responsible For Drug Resistance (2022, 2021, 2020, 2019, 2018)
 Superhydrophobic Drug Loaded Buttresses For Prevention Of Lung Tumor Recurrence (2022, 2021, 2020, 2019)

 Precise tumor targeting with logic CAR circuits (2022, 2021)
 Efficacy and Safety of a Novel, Implantable Drug-eluting Film in Sarcoma (2019, 2018, 2017, 2016)
 Flexible, Conformal, Polymeric Films for Lung Resection Margins (2014, 2013, 2012, 2011)
 Innovative Clinical Pathways in Lung Cancer Care for Vulnerable Populations (2012)
 NIR Imaging of Sentinel Nodes in Lung Cancer: Finding Micrometastases (2011, 2010, 2009, 2008)
 Mechanism of Facilitating Cell-Mediated Tx Tolerance (2007, 2006, 2005, 2004, 2003)
 Facilitating Cell Induced Tolerance In Organ Transplants (2001, 2000, 1999, 1998, 1997)

Colson also received over twenty AATS foundation grants.

Awards and recognitions 
 103rd president of the American Association for Thoracic Surgery (AATS)
 George H.A. Clowes, Jr. Research Career Development Award from the American College of Surgeons (ACS) (2006-2011)
 Edward M. Kennedy Award for Health Care Innovation from CIMIT
 First recipient of Michele Kessler Leadership Award in Women's Health (2006)
 AATS Alton Ochsner Research Scholarship
 Above and Beyond Award, Employer Support of the Guard and Reserve, US (2009)
 Maxwell Resident Career-Research Award (1998-1999)

In 2010 Colson was recognized by the Lung Cancer Alliance for her work "Out of the Shadows", a women's health policy and advocacy program regarding lung cancer in women. In 2020 Colson was interviewed by CTSNet after she was elected as the Vice President of the AATS. Colson is mentioned several Castle Connolly Medical publications.

In 2020, she was elected to the National Academy of Medicine.

Other accomplishments 
Colson is a co-inventor on six patents. She founded the Women's Lung Cancer Forum. She is the author of many journal articles and textbook chapters, including the text "Adult Chest Surgery".

References 

Year of birth missing (living people)
Living people
Rensselaer Polytechnic Institute alumni
University of Pittsburgh School of Medicine alumni
American thoracic surgeons
Women surgeons
Members of the National Academy of Medicine
Women medical researchers
Harvard Medical School faculty
Women bioengineers